NET Television is a free-to-air terrestrial television station in Malta owned by Media.link Communications, the media arm of the Nationalist Party. It started broadcasting in 1998 from Pietà, Malta. NET Television is also one of the most watched television channels, with it being the 3rd most viewed channel in Malta (7.88% of the population).

References

External links
  

Television stations in Malta
Television channels and stations established in 1998
1998 establishments in Malta
Nationalist Party (Malta) publications
Pietà, Malta